Film Stars Don't Die in Liverpool is a 2017 biographical romantic drama film directed by Paul McGuigan and starring Annette Bening and Jamie Bell, with a cast that includes Vanessa Redgrave and Julie Walters. It is based on the memoir of the same name by Peter Turner, which tells of his relationship with Academy Award-winning American actress Gloria Grahame in 1970s Liverpool and, some years later, her death from stomach cancer.

The film premiered at the Telluride Film Festival on 1 September 2017. It was released in the United Kingdom on 16 November by Lionsgate and in the United States on 29 December by Sony Pictures Classics. At the 71st British Academy Film Awards, it received three nominations: Best Actress (Bening), Best Actor (Bell) and Best Adapted Screenplay. The film was a box office flop, grossing  $4 million against a production budget of $10 million, but received generally positive reviews.

Synopsis
In media res, in October 1981, Gloria Grahame is playing the role of Amanda in The Glass Menagerie in Lancaster and takes ill. She calls upon a former lover, Peter Turner, who reluctantly takes her to his parents' home in Liverpool to recuperate.

Back in 1979, in the twilight of her once-prolific and Academy Award-winning career, Gloria is playing the role of Sadie in W. Somerset Maugham's Rain in London and asks another tenant at her boarding house—Peter—to practice dancing disco with her. Gloria is flirtatious with Peter, who is also an actor. They see Alien together, have a drink together afterward, and strike up a friendship. After an argument, their relationship becomes intimate, despite their noticeable age difference.

In October 1981, Peter's parents are still expressing support for Peter and Gloria's friendship. Peter and his parents acknowledge that Gloria needs more attentive medical attention for whatever is ailing her. However, Gloria insists that her illness isn't serious.

In 1979, Peter visits Gloria in Los Angeles and their romance continues at Gloria's modest Malibu trailer park home. Gloria's mother, Jeanne, demonstrates support for Peter and Gloria's romance, but Gloria's older sister, Joy, is hostile. Both encourage Peter not to marry Gloria, given Gloria's earlier and scandalous marriage to her former stepson Anthony Ray who was also significantly her junior. Peter and Gloria reveal to each other that they've both experimented with same-sex attraction.

In October 1981, once contacting Gloria's doctor in Lancaster, Peter learns that Gloria's breast cancer has returned after initial remission in 1975. Gloria has refused any further treatment. Peter eventually confronts Gloria with what he knows, but Gloria insists she'll get better. Peter reluctantly shares the prognosis with his family, Gloria's hosts. Peter tells his friend Eileen that he still loves Gloria.

From 1979, Gloria and Peter's romance continues until the spring of 1981, and Peter spends time with Gloria in New York City, including a visit from Eileen. Gloria invites Peter to live with her in America full-time. However, shortly thereafter, Gloria suddenly cools to the relationship without explanation, distancing herself from Peter. Gloria kicks him out of her New York City apartment, and he returns to Liverpool for an acting job in an Alan Bleasdale play.

It is revealed that Gloria's sudden change of heart in New York City was driven by her learning that her cancer had returned. Her earlier refusal of chemotherapy in 1975 has contributed to the cancer's return. Her distance from Peter and keeping of secrets was because of ongoing tests and doctor appointments. She doesn't share this with Peter and instead hopes to drive him away as the cancer is diagnosed as terminal.

In October 1981, Peter struggles with his family on how to approach care of Gloria. As she becomes increasingly weak, Gloria decides to allow Peter to inform her family of her illness. Peter surprises Gloria by taking her to a theatre to read from Romeo and Juliet (a scene in which the real actor Peter Turner makes a cameo appearance as stage hand Jack). They reconcile. Gloria's oldest son Timothy arrives from the US to assist Gloria in returning home. Peter gently packs her belongings as Gloria sleeps. Gloria says goodbye to Peter and his family and departs for the U.S. They share a final kiss.

The film concludes with footage of Gloria winning the Academy Award for Best Supporting Actress for her portrayal of Rosemary Barlow in The Bad and the Beautiful at the 25th Academy Awards.

Cast
 Annette Bening as Gloria Grahame
 Jamie Bell as Peter Turner
 Julie Walters as Bella Turner
 Kenneth Cranham as Joe Turner
 Stephen Graham as Joe Turner Jr.
 Vanessa Redgrave as Jeanne McDougall
 Frances Barber as Joy Hallward
 Leanne Best as Eileen
 Isabella Laughland as Vanessa
 Suzanne Bertish as Fifi Oscard
 Tom Brittney as Tim

Production
On 6 May 2016, it was reported that Annette Bening, Jamie Bell, and Julie Walters would star in an adaptation of Film Stars Don't Die in Liverpool by Peter Turner, a memoir about Turner's relationship with actress Gloria Grahame in the last years of her life. Paul McGuigan would direct from a script written by Matt Greenhalgh, and Barbara Broccoli and Colin Vaines would produce. On 27 June 2016, Vanessa Redgrave joined the cast.

On 27 June 2016, the film began filming in Liverpool and London. It then moved to Pinewood Studios, where it wrapped on 8 August 2016. To fill in for scenes set in New York City and Malibu, California, the crew used rear-screen projections. On 11 November 2017, Elvis Costello released an original song entitled "You Shouldn't Look at Me That Way", composed specifically for the film.

Production company Eon Productions is best known for producing the James Bond film franchise; Film Stars Don't Die in Liverpool was the second non-Bond film to be released under the Eon banner since the farcical comedy Call Me Bwana in 1963.

Release
In August 2017, Sony Pictures Classics acquired U.S. distribution rights to the film. The film had its world premiere at the Telluride Film Festival on 1 September 2017. It also screened at the Toronto International Film Festival on 9 September 2017.

The film was released in the United Kingdom on 16 November 2017 by Lionsgate and in the United States on 29 December 2017.

Reception

Box office
Film Stars Dont Die in Liverpool grossed $1 million in North America and $2.9 million in other territories, for a worldwide total of $4 million, against a budget of $10 million.

Critical response
On review aggregator Rotten Tomatoes, the film holds an approval rating of 80% based on 169 reviews, with an average rating of 6.7/10. The website's critical consensus reads, "Film Stars Dont Die in Liverpool showcases brilliant work from Annette Bening, whose performance is more than enough to outweigh this biopic's basic narrative." On Metacritic, which assigns a weighted average rating to reviews, the film has a normalised score of 65 out of 100, based on 34 critics, indicating "generally favorable reviews".

Accolades

References

External links

2017 films
American biographical drama films
American romantic drama films
British biographical drama films
British romantic drama films
2010s English-language films
Films directed by Paul McGuigan
Films produced by Barbara Broccoli
Films shot in Liverpool
Films shot in London
Films shot at Pinewood Studios
Lionsgate films
Sony Pictures Classics films
2017 biographical drama films
2017 romantic drama films
Eon Productions films
Films based on biographies
2010s American films
2010s British films